Ezenwa is a surname. Notable people with the surname include:

Ezenwa Otorogu, Nigerian footballer
Ezenwa Ukeagu, Nigerian basketball player
Chi Ezenwa, author
Ikechukwu Ezenwa, Nigerian footballer
Onyewuchi Francis Ezenwa (born 1968), Nigerian politician
Vanessa Ezenwa, American ecologist